The Zimbabwe cricket team toured Sri Lanka in January 2022 to play three One Day International (ODI) matches. The ODI series formed part of the inaugural 2020–2023 ICC Cricket World Cup Super League.

Originally, Zimbabwe were scheduled to tour Sri Lanka in October 2020 to play three ODIs and two Twenty20 International (T20I) matches. The tour was provisionally scheduled for the middle of October 2020 as part of the schedule released by the International Cricket Council in 2018. However, the series did not take place, and was later rescheduled for January 2022. On 4 January 2022, Rumesh Ratnayake was named as interim head coach for Sri Lanka, after Mickey Arthur's contract ended in December 2021. Craig Ervine was again named as Zimbabwe's captain for the tour, after previously leading the team for their visits to Ireland and Scotland in August and September 2021.

Sri Lanka won the opening match by five wickets, with Zimbabwe's Sean Williams top-scoring with a century. Zimbabwe won the second match by 22 runs to level the series. Sri Lanka's Dasun Shanaka also scored a century, but as per Sean Williams in the first match, the centurion ended up on the losing side. In the final match of the series, Zimbabwe were bowled out for 70 runs, with Sri Lanka winning by 184 runs to win the series 2–1.

Squads

On 7 January 2022, Sri Lanka Cricket (SLC) lifted the suspensions of Niroshan Dickwella, Danushka Gunathilaka and Kusal Mendis. The players had initially been banned by the SLC from international cricket for one year after breaking COVID-19 bio-bubble rules during the tour of England in July 2021, but became available for selection when their bans were ended early.

Prior to the series, Sri Lanka's vice-captain, Dhananjaya de Silva pulled out of the tour following the birth of his first child. Janith Liyanage, Kamil Mishara and Avishka Fernando were ruled out of the tour, after they each tested positive for COVID-19. Lahiru Kumara and Kalana Perera were not selected due to poor fitness standards. Zimbabwe coach Lalchand Rajput also tested positive ahead of the series, meaning that he would miss at least the first two ODI matches.

Sri Lanka also named Ashen Bandara, Pulina Tharanga, Nimesh Vimukthi, Ashian Daniel, Asitha Fernando and Vishwa Fernando as standby players. Minod Bhanuka was ruled out of Sri Lanka's squad, with Niroshan Dickwella added as his replacement, with Ashen Bandara also added to their main squad.

ODI series

1st ODI

2nd ODI

3rd ODI

Statistics

Most runs

Most wickets

Sri Lankan cricket team in Australia in 2021-22

References

External links
 Series home at ESPN Cricinfo

2020 in Zimbabwean cricket
2020 in Sri Lankan cricket
Cricket events postponed due to the COVID-19 pandemic
International cricket competitions in 2021–22
Zimbabwean cricket tours of Sri Lanka